The OVW Tag Team Championship formerly known as the OVW Southern Tag Team Championship is the tag team titles of Ohio Valley Wrestling. Created in 1997, the first champions were Nick Dinsmore and Flash Flanagan. There have been 178 reigns shared between 109 different teams consisting of 148 distinctive champions. The current champions are Luscious Lawrence and Omar Amir.

Title history

Combined reigns

By team

By wrestler

See also
OVW Heavyweight Championship 
OVW Television Championship
OVW Women's Championship

References

External links
OVW Tag Team Championship at Solie's Title Histories
OVW Tag Team Championship

Ohio Valley Wrestling championships
Tag team wrestling championships
Recurring sporting events established in 1997
1997 establishments in Kentucky